"Take You There" is a song by American singer and Making the Band 4 alumnus Donnie Klang. It was the sole debut single to come off his debut album Just a Rolling Stone (2008). Klang co-wrote the song alongside mentor Diddy, who shares featuring credits with Klang, and production team the Soul Diggaz. The song was released as the album's lead single on March 23, 2008 on digital download. "Take You There" managed to chart at number 10 on the US Billboard Bubbling Under Hot 100 and number 83 on the Billboard Pop 100.

Music video
Directed by Ray Kay, the video starts out with Diddy exiting a club and entering a black limousine containing Donnie and two women in front of them. Diddy and Donnie go on a nightly excursion by going to a liquor store where, along with getting liquor, they attract two other women in the store and they come along with them. The limo stops at a condo where both men get entangled with the various women surrounding them. The video made its premiere on August 8, 2008 on FNMTV.

Charts

References

Sean Combs songs
Bad Boy Records singles
2008 debut singles
Music videos directed by Ray Kay
Song recordings produced by Soul Diggaz
Songs written by Sean Combs
2008 songs